Charles Benjamin Jackson (July 22, 1937 – February 16, 2023) was an American R&B singer who was one of the first artists to record material by Burt Bacharach and Hal David successfully. He has performed with moderate success since 1961. His hits include "I Don't Want to Cry", "Any Day Now", "I Keep Forgettin'", and "All Over the World".

Career
Jackson was born in Winston-Salem, North Carolina in 1937. He grew up in Latta, South Carolina, singing in a gospel group, and moved to Pittsburgh when he was 13.

Between 1957 and 1959, he was a member of The Del-Vikings, singing lead on the 1957 release "Willette". After leaving the group, he was "discovered" by Luther Dixon when he opened for Jackie Wilson at the Apollo Theater. He signed a recording contract with Scepter Records subsidiary Wand Records. His first single, "I Don't Want to Cry", which he co-wrote (with Luther Dixon) and recorded in November 1960, was his first hit (released in January 1961). The song charted on both the R&B and pop charts. In 1962, Jackson's recording of the Burt Bacharach-Bob Hilliard song "Any Day Now" became a sizable hit and his signature song. His popularity in the 1960s prompted him to buy out the time on his contract from Scepter and move to Motown Records. He later commented the decision was "one of the worst mistakes I ever made in my life". He recorded a few successful singles including "Honey Come Back" for Motown. Then he recorded for All Platinum and other labels but with minimal success.

After meeting producer/composer Charles Wallert at the Third Annual Beach Music Awards, the two collaborated to record "How Long Have You Been Loving Me" on Carolina Records. In 1998, Jackson teamed with longtime friend Dionne Warwick and recorded "If I Let Myself Go"; it was arranged as a duet by Wallert for Wave Entertainment. The recording received critical acclaim charting at number 19 on the Gavin Adult Contemporary Charts. Jackson then released "What Goes Around, Comes Around", another Wallert production and composition; it reached No. 13 on the Gavin Charts.

Legacy
Several of Jackson's songs later became hits for other artists including Ronnie Milsap, whose 1982 cover version of "Any Day Now" reached No. 1 on the Country and Adult Contemporary charts. Michael McDonald covered "I Keep Forgettin'" with much success. "I Keep Forgettin'" was also covered by David Bowie on his album Tonight, as well as on a version produced by Phil Spector for the Checkmates, Ltd. Jackson was close friends with political strategist Lee Atwater. He appears in the documentary Boogie Man: The Lee Atwater Story.

Australian pop-rock band Big Pig recorded a cover to "I Can't Break Away", simply titled "Breakaway", which was used as the opening theme to the 1989 film Bill & Ted's Excellent Adventure. The song was covered in 2007 by house music singer Inaya Day.

On 4 October 2015, Chuck Jackson was inducted into the Rhythm and Blues Music Hall of Fame. His song "Hand it Over" was featured on the 2019 video game, Far Cry New Dawn. In 2021, his song "Any Day Now" was used in a Volkswagen commercial.

Jackson died on February 16, 2023, at the age of 85.

Awards 
 1992: Rhythm and Blues Foundation, Pioneer Award
 2009: Carolina Beach Music Hall of Fame, Joe Pope Pioneer Award
 2015:  National Rhythm and Blues Hall of Fame

Discography (selected)

Albums
 1961: I Don't Want to Cry! (Wand WDM-650)
 1962: Any Day Now (Wand WDM-654)
 1963: Encore! (Wand WDM-655)
 1964: Chuck Jackson on Tour (Wand WDM-658)
 1965: Mr. Everything (Wand WDM-667)
 1965: Saying Something, with Maxine Brown (Wand WDM-669)
 1966: A Tribute to Rhythm and Blues (Wand WDM-673)
 1966: A Tribute to Rhythm and Blues, Volume 2 (Wand WDM-676)
 1966: Dedicated to the King (Wand WDM-680)
 1967: Greatest Hits (Wand WDM-683)
 1967: Hold On, We're Coming, with Maxine Brown (Wand WDM-678)
 1967: The Early Show, with Tammi Terrell (Wand WDM-682)
 1968: Chuck Jackson Arrives (Motown)
 1969: Goin' Back to Chuck Jackson (Motown)
 1970: Teardrops Keep Falling on My Heart (Motown)
 1974: Through All Times (ABC)
 1975: Needing You, Wanting You (All Platinum)
 1977: The Great Chuck Jackson (Bulldog)
 1980: After You (EMI America)
 1980: I Wanna Give You Some Love (EMI America)
 1992: I'll Take Care of You, with Cissy Houston (Shanachie Entertainment)
 1994: Chuck Jackson (Platinum Pop)
 1994: Encore/Mr. Everything (Kent-UK)
 1998: Smooth, Smooth Jackson (Sequel Records)

Singles

Singles on Tamla Motown (UK)
 TMG651 "Girls Girls Girls" / "(You Can't Let the Boy Overpower) The Man in You"  - 7"
 TMG729 "Honey Come Back" / "What Am I Gonna Do Without You" - 7"

References

External links
Chuck Jackson - official website
Chuck Jackson speaks about Lee Atwater in Boogie Man: The Lee Atwater Story
Chuck Jackson -Pittsburgh Music History

1937 births
2023 deaths
American rhythm and blues musicians
People from Latta, South Carolina
Musicians from Pittsburgh
Northern soul musicians
American soul singers
Singers from Pennsylvania
All Platinum artists
Motown artists
Scepter Records artists
Wand Records artists